Jonathan Peter Sharp (20 February 1964 – 29 May 2009), better known by the pseudonym Jonny Dollar, was an English record producer and songwriter.

Jonathan was born in Westminster, London and his father was the Australian film director, Don Sharp. 

Dollar is best known for his work on the Bristol collective Massive Attack's first album Blue Lines, on which he co-wrote the single "Unfinished Sympathy". Sharp's pseudonym came about during the recording of Blue Lines, where he was the only person working on the album being regularly paid

He co-produced Neneh Cherry's albums Raw Like Sushi, Homebrew, and Man; plus Gabrielle's third album Rise.

He provided early remixes for Portishead and co-wrote both the anti-racism song "7 Seconds" featuring Youssou N'dour, and Kylie Minogue's "Confide In Me". 

Later works include Natty's "Man Like I" and Eliza Doolittle's eponymous debut album.

He died of cancer in May 2009 at the age of 45.

References

1964 births
2009 deaths
Deaths from cancer in England
English record producers
English songwriters
People from Westminster
Musicians from London
British trip hop musicians